Juan Carlos Bianchi (born 22 January 1970) is a former tennis player from Venezuela, who represented his native country at the 1996 Summer Olympics in Atlanta, Georgia and played collegiate tennis at the University of Alabama for the Alabama Crimson Tide. Partnering with Nicolas Pereira at the Olympic Games, he was defeated in the first round of the doubles competition. The right-hander reached his highest singles ATP-ranking on September 19, 1994, when he became the number 384 of the world.

References

External links
 
 
 
 

1970 births
Living people
Sportspeople from Maracay
Venezuelan male tennis players
Venezuelan people of Italian descent
Tennis players at the 1996 Summer Olympics
Olympic tennis players of Venezuela
Pan American Games medalists in tennis
Pan American Games silver medalists for Venezuela
Tennis players at the 1995 Pan American Games
Competitors at the 1994 South American Games
South American Games gold medalists for Venezuela
South American Games medalists in tennis
Central American and Caribbean Games bronze medalists for Venezuela
Central American and Caribbean Games medalists in tennis
Alabama Crimson Tide men's tennis players
20th-century Venezuelan people
21st-century Venezuelan people